Fedotovsky is a rural locality (a khutor) in Okladnenskoye Rural Settlement, Uryupinsky District, Volgograd Oblast, Russia. The population was 70 as of 2010. There are 2 streets.

Geography 
Fedotovsky is located in steppe, 25 km southeast of Uryupinsk (the district's administrative centre) by road. Okladnensky is the nearest rural locality.

References 

Rural localities in Uryupinsky District